Reichel/Pugh is a yacht design company based in San Diego, California, United States.  Founded in 1983, the studio is led by John Reichel and Jim Pugh.

Since the late 1980s, Reichel/Pugh-designed yachts have successfully competed in many of the world's historic races, including the America's Cup.  Their designs currently hold the course records for a number of the best-known yacht races, such as the Sydney-Hobart race.

Several Reichel/Pugh-designed yachts are in series production, including modern Melges boats such as the Melges 15 (awarded 2022 “Boat of the Year” Overall by Sailing World Magazine), Melges 14 (awarded 2016 “Boat of the Year - Best Dinghy" by Sailing World Magazine), Melges 17, Melges 20, Melges 24 (awarded 1994 “Boat of the Year” Overall by Sailing World Magazine), Melges 30 (currently out of production), and the Melges 32.

R/P 130' My Song superyacht was named “Most Innovative Yacht of the Year” and “Sailing Yacht of the Year” by World Superyacht Awards, is Transatlantic Race record-setter, and Loro Piana Superyacht Regatta winner.

R/P 220' Hetairos superyacht is considered the world’s most spectacular ketch, earned World Superyacht Award’s “Notable Contribution to the Technical Advancement of Sailing Superyachts,” won the St Barths Bucket 2019 & 2022 overall, and is a Transatlantic Superyacht Regatta winner.

St Barths Bucket overall winners include Reichel/Pugh designs Visione 147’ (2015), Nilaya 112' (2018), Hetairos 220' (2019).

Sydney-Hobart Reichel/Pugh Maxis have taken line honors 12 times, won overall five times and reset the course record three times.

America's Cup 2007 

John Reichel and Jim Pugh were closely involved in the design of the IACC yacht ESP-88 and ESP-97 for the Desafío Español 2007 syndicate who reached the semi-final stage of the Louis Vuitton Cup 2007 used to select the challenger for the 2007 America's Cup.

See also
Alfa Romeo I (2002)
Alfa Romeo II (2005)
Wild Oats XI (2005)
Alfa Romeo III (2008)

External links 

 Reichel/ Pugh designed Yachts

Reichel/Pugh